If a Thousand Clarinets is a 1965 Czechoslovak musical directed by Ján Roháč and Vladimír Svitáček. The film was a success especially among younger audience, but raised some controversies because of its anti-war message.

References

External links
 CSFD.cz - Kdyby tisíc klarinetů
 

1965 films
Czech musical films
1960s Czech-language films
Czechoslovak black-and-white films
1960s Czech films
Czechoslovak musical films
Czech black-and-white films